Robert Gregson is an American filmmaker. During the reconstruction of the Ed Sullivan Theater for the new Late Show with Stephen Colbert, Gregson directed "Envisioning a New Home for The Late Show", a viral mini-doc about the renovation. Gregson's short film The Refrigerator won the Best New Director Award at the 2015 Brooklyn Film Festival. In 2015, Gregson and Local Empire Productions raised $35,635 on Kickstarter to produce the feature film Trivia Night, a dark comedy about an underground pub quiz trivia legend in NYC. Trivia Night earned the Best Feature Film Award at the 2016 Omaha Film Festival.

References

External links 
 

Living people
American film directors
Year of birth missing (living people)